Trelawny Tigers operated as a British Premier League speedway team from 2001 to 2003 at the Clay Country Moto Parc.

History 
The club was formed in 2001, as a replacement for the St Austell Gulls team that had raced at the venue since 1997. Trelawny Tigers joined the Premier League (division 2) and finished 14th in their inaugural 2001 Premier League speedway season.

The team enjoyed limited success on track, the highlight being winning the 2002 Premier Trophy competition after defeating Sheffield Tigers over two legs. During the club's short history, its top rider was Chris Harris. The club were responsible for bringing Slovenian Matej Žagar into British League Scene in 2003 and he firmly established himself as one of the Premier League's top riders. The track record holder was Argentinian Emiliano Sanchez.

In 2003, the club also ran a junior team known as the Trelawny Pitbulls who competed in the Conference Trophy competition. After the 2003 season (in which the Tigers finished 8th) the team was disbanded.

Track
The track, 230m in length, was unique in its setting being situated in a disused china clay pit near St Austell, Cornwall. The compact track was renowned throughout the league for the quality of its preparation and the racing it produced.

Season summary

Riders previous seasons

2003 riders=

 (c)

2002 riders

2001 riders

References

Defunct British speedway teams
Sport in Cornwall